The 1992 Hungarian motorcycle Grand Prix was the ninth round of the 1992 Grand Prix motorcycle racing season. It took place on the weekend of 10–12 July 1992 at the Hungaroring circuit.

500 cc race report
Wayne Rainey and Kevin Schwantz are back from injury, Schwantz with a thin cast that will allow him to ride. Yamaha introduced its YZR500 version of a "big bang" bike for Rainey. Rainey tried using the old engine with the new chassis, but the rear wheel spun too much and the power came on too abruptly.

Doug Chandler on pole; John Kocinski gets the start but rain brings out a red flag and a new race.

Wet restart goes to Eddie Lawson, then Schwantz and Rainey. Randy Mamola moves to the lead.

Order becomes: Mamola, Rainey, Chandler and Schwantz. Chandler passes Rainey.

Lawson started the race with cut slicks, and as conditions dry out, he moves quickly through the field, passing Schwantz in 4th place. Crivillé pits and switches bikes.

Lawson passes Rainey, then Mamola. Chandler still ahead. Many riders are pitting to change tires.

Lawson passes Chandler with 2 laps to go. It is Cagiva's first win in the premier class.

Schwantz: "To finish where I finished, actually in front of him, was almost a race win in itself for me. To have had Wayne as far out in front of me as he was early in the race, to reel him in and pass him and to leave with more points on him was great."

500 cc classification

References

Hungarian motorcycle Grand Prix
Hungarian
Motorcycle Grand Prix